The UK Independence Party (UKIP) leadership election of 2010 was triggered on 17 August 2010 with the resignation of the incumbent leader, Lord Pearson of Rannoch, following difficulties during the 2010 general election campaign, with the result announced on 5 November 2010. Lord Pearson of Rannoch had been leader of the party since the previous leadership election, less than a year earlier. Jeffrey Titford was appointed interim leader during the summer by the UKIP National Executive Committee. Nigel Farage won the election with over 60% of the vote.

Candidates 
All candidates required support from 51 members of UKIP in order to appear on the ballot.  The following candidates were confirmed as standing in the election:
 David Campbell Bannerman, UKIP MEP for the East of England
 Tim Congdon, economist
 Nigel Farage, MEP for South East England and former leader
 Winston McKenzie, former boxer; former Conservative member (2006–2008).

MEP Nikki Sinclaire originally announced she had hoped to stand for the leadership, as did MEP Godfrey Bloom who stated he would stand if Nigel Farage decided not to do so. Gerard Batten initially intended to stand, but withdrew and gave his support to Congdon. Lord Monckton also was considering standing but decided not to run.

Results 
Nigel Farage won with 60.5% of the vote.

References

External links 
 Official UKIP website
 Tim Congdon's campaign website

2010 elections in the United Kingdom
2010
UK Independence Party leadership election